JS Yūgiri (DD-153) is an  of the Japan Maritime Self-Defense Force.

Development and design 
The Asagiri class is equipped for combat and interception missions, and is primarily armed with anti-ship weapons. They carry two of the Mk-141 Guided Missile Launching System (GMLS), which are anti-ship missile systems. The ship is also fitted to be used against submarines. She also carries the Mk-32 Surface Vessel Torpedo Tubes (SVTT), which can be used as an anti-submarine weapon. The ship has two of these systems abeam to starboard and to port. They are fitted with an Oto-Melara 62-caliber gun to be used against sea and air targets.

The ship can have up to 220 personnel on board. The ship is also fitted to accommodate one aircraft. The ship's flight deck can be used to service a SH-60J9(K) Seahawk helicopter.

Construction and career 
Yūgiri was laid down on 25 February 1986 and launched on 19 September 1986 by Sumitomo Heavy Industries, Uraga. She was commissioned on 17 March 1988.

The destroyer participated in maritime training in the Philippines from 1 July to 4 August 1995. On 2 November, the same year, US Secretary of Defense William J. Perry visited the ship.  The ship participated in the Exercise RIMPAC from 19 May to 13 August 1996. Though a malfunction in the Phalanx CIWS was initially implicated as the cause of the incident, human error was later blamed.

The vessel was dispatched to the Great East Japan Earthquake caused by the 2011 off the Pacific coast of Tōhoku Earthquake on 11 March 2011.

On 23 January 2013, on her way home after completing her mission, she conducted goodwill training with the Maldives National Defense Force Coast Guard patrol boat Shahid Ali in the Indian Ocean, and returned to Ōminato on 11 February. On 7 March 2013, she was transferred to the 11th Escort Squadron under the direct control of the escort fleet due to reorganization, and the fixed port became Yokosuka again and transferred to the same area. After the transfer, undergo regular inspections and life extension work at Hakodate Dock. 

In addition, on 1 September on the way back to Japan, a goodwill training was conducted with the Philippine Navy's .

In 2021, the ship participated in Exercise AMAN-21 in Pakistan and later visited Karachi port for joint naval exercises with the Pakistan Navy.

Gallery

References 

Asagiri-class destroyers
Ships built by Sumitomo Heavy Industries
1987 ships